This is a list of legislatures by number of members. Non-sovereign entities and unrecognized states are marked in italics.

Lists

See also 
List of legislatures by country
Cube root law

Notes

References 

Legislatures